Márk Balaska (born 25 September 1996) is a Hungarian sprint canoeist.

He participated at the 2018 ICF Canoe Sprint World Championships.

References

1996 births
Hungarian male canoeists
Living people
ICF Canoe Sprint World Championships medalists in kayak
21st-century Hungarian people